Carex × xanthocarpa is a hybrid species of sedge and is native to Europe and Quebec in Canada. Its parents are Carex flava and Carex hostiana.

References

xanthocarpa
Flora of Northern Europe
Flora of the Baltic states
Flora of Central Europe
Flora of France
Flora of Italy
Flora of Romania
Flora of Yugoslavia
Flora of Quebec
Plant nothospecies
Flora without expected TNC conservation status